Geronimo John Allison (born January 18, 1994) is an American football wide receiver for the Vegas Vipers of the XFL. He played college football at Illinois, and was signed by the Green Bay Packers in 2016 as an undrafted free agent. After four seasons with the Packers, he joined the Lions in 2020.

Early life
In an interview with The News-Gazette, Allison said his mother Melissa Glover gave him his first name because she wanted to give him "a unique name." He credits his mother with instilling his religious faith, which he expresses in post-game prayers with opponents and teammates at midfield.

Allison attended Spoto High School in Riverview, Florida. He was academically ineligible his sophomore and junior years, but worked in private classes with the coach's wife Anne Caparaso to improve his grades and had a successful senior season.

College career
Due to his academic struggles in high school, Allison began college at Iowa Western Community College in Council Bluffs, Iowa. He proved a bright student, finishing an associate degree in just three semesters; he also led the team to a 22–1 record in two seasons, an NJCAA title, and led the conference in receptions, yards, and touchdowns his second year.

Allison transferred to the University of Illinois, where he played for the Fighting Illini in 2014 and 2015. His junior year, he was usually the second option to freshman star Mike Dudek, though he caught five touchdowns to Dudek's six for the 6–7 Illini. In week 3, he had a career-high six receptions for 160 yards and two touchdowns in a lopsided loss to Washington. Allison took over the top spot his senior year, replacing the injured Dudek for 882 yards but only three touchdowns during the 5–7 campaign. He had over 90 yards receiving in five of the first seven games, but five or fewer receptions in the final five games of the season. He was an All-Big Ten honorable mention, and won the team's Service Above Self award.

College statistics

Professional career

Green Bay Packers
After going undrafted in the 2016 NFL Draft, Allison signed with the Green Bay Packers on May 6, 2016.

On September 3, 2016, Allison was released by the Packers during final team cuts, but re-signed to the Packers' practice squad two days later. On October 24, 2016, he was promoted from the practice squad to the active roster. Allison made his NFL debut against the Atlanta Falcons in Week 8. His first career NFL reception came as a four-yard touchdown from Aaron Rodgers in the second quarter.

Allison finished his rookie year with 12 receptions for 202 yards and two touchdowns in ten games and two starts.

On July 19, 2017, Allison was suspended for the first game of the 2017 season for violating the league's substance-abuse policy. During Week 3, he had career-highs with six receptions and 122 yards against the Cincinnati Bengals, and finished fourth among Packers receivers on the season with 23 receptions.

Allison finished his second professional season with 23 receptions for 253 yards.

Allison was re-signed by the Packers on March 14, 2018. He started the season well, with 19 receptions for 289 yards and two touchdowns before suffering a concussion in Week 4. Allison was placed on injured reserve on November 6, 2018 after undergoing groin surgery.

On March 13, 2019, Allison was re-signed by the Packers.

Detroit Lions
On April 6, 2020, Allison signed a one-year contract with the Detroit Lions. On August 2, 2020, Allison announced he would opt out of the 2020 season due to the COVID-19 pandemic.

On August 31, 2021, Allison was released by the Lions. He was re-signed to the practice squad on September 15. He was promoted to the active roster on October 20. He was released on November 16 and re-signed to the practice squad.

Atlanta Falcons
On May 16, 2022, Allison signed with the Atlanta Falcons. He was released on August 23, 2022.

Vegas Vipers 
Allison was signed by the Vegas Vipers of the XFL on Monday January 21, 2023.

Career statistics

Regular season

Postseason

References

External links
 
 Green Bay Packers bio
 Illinois Fighting Illini bio

1994 births
Living people
Players of American football from Tampa, Florida
Spoto High School alumni
American football wide receivers
Iowa Western Reivers football players
Illinois Fighting Illini football players
Green Bay Packers players
Detroit Lions players
Atlanta Falcons players
Vegas Vipers players